Party Heard Around the World is the ninth studio album by American country music group Lonestar, released on April 27, 2010. It is the band's first studio album since 2006's Mountains. It debuted at No. 20 on the Billboard Country Albums chart and No. 100 on the Billboard 200, selling 5,000 copies in its first week. It is the only album to feature Cody Collins on lead vocals since Richie McDonald left in 2007 to pursue a solo career then returned the following year.

Background

Party Heard Around the World is their first and only release with lead vocalist Cody Collins, who joined Lonestar in 2007, after the departure of lead singer Richie McDonald. It is also the first release for Saguaro Road Records.

On March 31, Lonestar gave an exclusive concert for QVC where they performed some of their hit songs, such as "Amazed" and "I'm Already There", and some selections from Party Heard Around the World.

Lonestar was featured as the first "house band" on The Price Is Right on June 17, 2010. In their appearance, they performed The Price Is Right theme song throughout the show, and Party Heard Around the World featured in one of the two showcases.

Singles

The first single from the album, Let Me Love You was released in early 2008, where it debuted at #60 on the Billboard Charts. In an interview with americajr.com, when asked about the story behind the song, Collins responded by saying "Well, I didn't write the song, but it's basically a love song, [...] It's a guy asking a girl to open up your heart to me. Basically, let me in. A lot of girls don't want to do that these days. They think we're all douche bags. It's nice for a girl to open up to somebody and let somebody in."

You're The Reason Why was released as the second single in March 2010.

Critical reception
Blake Boldt of Engine 145 gave the album two-and-a-half stars out of five, calling it "ultimately forgettable fluff" and criticizing Collins' "silky smooth voice [that] barely makes a ripple."

Michael McCall with the Associated Press criticized the album by saying "the revamped country band tries to forge a future by shifting away from its past. No longer portraying themselves as content fathers relaxing on the front porch, Lonestar now prefers combing clubs and beachfronts for love and good times."

Track listing

Personnel 
From Party Heard Around the World liner notes.

Lonestar
 Cody Collins – lead vocals
 Dean Sams – pianos, synthesizers, Hammond B3 organ, backing vocals
 Michael Britt – electric guitars, mandolin
 Keech Rainwater – drums

Additional musicians
 Troy Lancaster – electric guitars
 Billy Panda – acoustic guitar
 Biff Watson – acoustic guitar
 Larry Franklin – fiddle, mandolin
 Mark Hill – bass guitar
 Eric Darken – percussion
 Perry Coleman – backing vocals
 Wes Hightower – backing vocals

Production
 Mike Jason – executive producer 
 Lonestar – producers
 Dean Sams – additional production, digital editing 
 Jeff Balding – engineer
 Mills Logan – engineer
 Justin Niebank – engineer
 Drew Bollman – assistant engineer 
 Lowell Reynolds – assistant engineer 
 Brien Sager – assistant engineer 
 Jed Hackett – digital editing 
 Hank Williams – mastering at MasterMix (Nashville, Tennessee)
 Bas Hartong – A&R 
 Kim Sams – production assistant 
 Janine Morris – project manager 
 Jeff Crump – art direction 
 Latocki Team Creative – art direction, design 
 Andy Baggett – design
 Joseph Anthony Baker – photography 
 Corey Wagner and Sanctuary Music Group – management 
 Olivia Kim – editorial research

Charts

References

2010 albums
Lonestar albums